Sanshiro may refer to:

Plawres Sanshiro, a popular anime series aired in 1983 in Japan, Hong Kong, the Middle East and Greece and Algeria
Sanshiro Sugata, the directorial debut of the Oscar-winning Japanese film director Akira Kurosawa
Sanshiro Sugata Part II, a 1945 film written and directed by Akira Kurosawa.
Segata Sanshiro, a fictional character created by Sega to advertise the Sega Saturn in Japan between 1997 and 1998
Sanshirō (novel), a novel written in 1908 by Natsume Sōseki, about a young man coming of age in the late Meiji Period

People with the given name
, Japanese wrestler
, Japanese Christian socialist
, Japanese judoka
, Japanese professional wrestler

Japanese masculine given names